John Hyacinth Talbot (1794 – 30 April 1868) of Ballytrent, County Wexford  was an Irish Repeal Association politician.

He was the son of Matthew Talbot of Ballynamony, Co. Wexford and Jane, Countess d'Arcy and educated at Stonyhurst College, Lancashire.

He sat again for the seat from 1847 to 1852 when, again, he did not seek re-election. He was selected as High Sheriff of Wexford for 1855.

He was a member of the Reform Club.

He married twice. In 1822, he married Anne Eliza Redmond, daughter of Walter Redmond of Wexford, a banker. In 1851 he married Eliza, daughter of Sir John Power, Bt, with whom he had a son and heir, also John Hyacinth Talbot, born in 1851.

References

External links
 

1794 births
1868 deaths
Members of the Parliament of the United Kingdom for County Wexford constituencies (1801–1922)
UK MPs 1832–1835
UK MPs 1835–1837
UK MPs 1837–1841
UK MPs 1847–1852
Irish Repeal Association MPs
High Sheriffs of Wexford